Lake Erie Basin consists of Lake Erie and surrounding watersheds, which are typically named after the river, creek, or stream that provides drainage into the lake. The watersheds are located in the states of Indiana, Michigan, New York, Ohio, and Pennsylvania in the United States, and in the province of Ontario in Canada. The basin is part of the Great Lakes Basin and Saint Lawrence River Watershed, which feeds into the Atlantic Ocean. 80% of the lake's water flows in from the Detroit River, with only 9% coming from all of the remaining watersheds combined. (The remainder (11%) is derived from direct precipitation into the lake.)

History 

The Lake Erie Basin was formed at the end of the Wisconsin glaciation. The basin was part of Glacial Lake Maumee until an eastern drainage opened at Niagara, at which point the Maumee River Watershed reversed its flow eastward. The Great Black Swamp is thought to be a remnant of the glacial lake.

Geography

Indiana 
 Maumee Watershed (Adams, Allen, DeKalb, Noble, Steuben, and Wells counties) (see Ohio)
 Maumee River
 St. Joseph River
Cedar Creek (Indiana)
 St. Mary's River

Michigan 

 Belle Watershed (Lapeer, Macomb, Oakland, and St. Clair counties)
 Belle River
 Black Watershed
 Black River
 Clinton Watershed (Lapeer, Macomb, Oakland, and St. Clair counties)
 Clinton River
 Detroit Watershed (see also Ontario)
 Detroit River
 Ecorse River
 River Rouge
 Huron Watershed (Livingston, Monroe, Oakland, Washtenaw, and Wayne counties)
 Huron River
 Portage River
 Pine Watershed
 Pine River
 Raisin Watershed
 River Raisin
 Maumee Watershed (see Ohio)
 Tiffin River becomes Bean Creek in northern Ohio and Michigan

New York 

 Buffalo River Watershed (Erie, Genesse, and Wyoming counties)
 Buffalo Creek, Little Buffalo Creek, and Buffalo River
 Cayuga Creek
 Cazenovia Creek
 Hunter Creek
 Cattaraugus Creek Watershed (Cattaraugus, Chautauqua, Erie, and Wyoming counties)
 Cattaraugus Creek
 Chautauqua Creek - Lake Erie Watershed (Chautauqua County) (see also Pennsylvania)
 Beaver Creek
 Chautauqua Creek
 Crooked Brook
 Hyde Creek
 Scott Creek
 Silver Creek
 Twentymile Creek
 Walnut Creek

Ohio 

 Ashtabula-Chagrin Watershed (Ashtabula, Cuyahoga, Geauga, Lake, and Portage counties) (see also Pennsylvania)
 Ashtabula River
 Chagrin River
 Auglaize Watershed (Allen, Auglaize, Defiance, Mercer, Paulding, Putnam, and Van Wert counties)
 Auglaize River
 Ottawa River
 Black-Rocky Watershed (Ashland, Cuyahoga, Huron, Lorain, and Medina counties)
 Black River
 Rocky River
 Blanchard Watershed (Allen, Hancock, Hardin, Putnam, and Wyandot counties)
 Blanchard River
 Cedar-Portage Watershed (Hancock, Lucas, Ottawa, Sandusky, and Wood counties)
 Cedar Creek
 Crane Creek
 Packer Creek
 Portage River
 Rusha Creek
 Toussaint River
 Turtle Creek
 Chautauqua-Conneaut Watershed (Ashtabula County) (see also Pennsylvania)
 Conneaut Creek
 Cuyahoga Watershed (Cuyahoga, Geauga, Portage, and Summit counties)
 Cuyahoga River
 Grand Watershed (Ashtabula, Geauga, Lake, Portage, and Trumbull counties)
 Grand River
 Huron-Vermilion Watershed (Ashland, Crawford, Erie, Huron, Lorain, Richland, and Seneca counties)
 Huron River
 Vermilion River
 Maumee Watershed (Defiance, Fulton, Hancock, Henry, Lucas, Putnam, Williams, and Wood counties) (see Michigan)
 Bad Creek
 Beaver Creek
 Brush Creek
 Maumee River
 Swan Creek
 Tenmile Creek
 Tiffin River becomes Bean Creek in northern Ohio and Michigan
 Turkeyfoot Creek
 Ottawa-Stony Watershed (Fulton and Lucas counties) (see also Michigan)
 Ottawa River
 Sandusky Watershed (Crawford, Erie, Hardin, Huron, Marion, Ottawa, Richland, Sandusky, Seneca, and Wyandot counties)
 Sandusky River

Pennsylvania 

 Ashtabula-Chagrin Watershed (Erie County) (see also Ohio)
 Ashtabula River
 Chautauqua-Conneaut Watershed (Crawford and Erie counties) (see also Ohio)
 Conneaut Creek
 Turkey Creek
 Lake Erie Watershed (Crawford and Erie counties)

Ontario 

 Detroit River Watershed (see also Michigan)
 Avon River
 Detroit River
 Lake St. Clair
 St. Clair River
 Sydenham River
 Thames River
 Big Otter Creek
 Little Otter Creek
 South Otter Creek
 Clear Creek
 Long Point Creek
 Big Creek
 Venison Creek
 Dedrick Creek
 Fisherville Creek
Hay Creek
 Lynn River Watershed
 Lynn River
Nanticoke Creek
Sandusk Creek
 
 Grand River Watershed is the largest drainage in southern Ontario at 2,600 sq mi (7,000 km²)
 Grand River
 Conestogo River
 Eramosa River
 Nith River
 Speed River
 Nanticoke Creek (Ontario)
 Big Creek
 Big Otter Creek

Economy 
Agricultural, industrial, and residential land use are the primary nonpoint sources of pollution in the Lake Erie Basin. National and state environmental agencies, as well as interstate and binational cooperative efforts, focus on water quality, especially since the freshwater lake is used extensively for drinking water, recreation, and the fishing industry. Habitat and flow alteration cause siltation and sedimentation issues which can require dredging. Fertilizer runoff from farms and residences and unplanned releases from sewage treatment plants promote eutrophication through nutrient and organic enrichment, bacterial contamination, and the appearance of ammonium hydroxide. Industrial land use adds metals that flow into the basin and cause sediment contamination.

See also 
 Great Lakes
 Waterways that feed the Lake Erie Basin
 Indiana
 Michigan
 New York
 Ohio
 Ontario
 Pennsylvania

References

External links

Overall 
 Lakenet map of North American watersheds
 Lakenet profile of Lake Erie Basin
 Lakewide Management Plan (LaMP)
 Lake Erie Basin integrated habitat and mapping project of the Great Lakes Commission
 USGS Water Quality in the Lake Erie / Lake Saint Clair Drainages - MI, OH, IN, NY and PA 1996-1998 (Circular 1203)

Indiana 
 See Map of Ohio's Principal Streams and Drainage Areas, including a small but important extension of waterway mapping across Ohio's Lake Erie Basin borders into the states of Indiana, Michigan, and Pennsylvania

Michigan 
 Michigan and the Lake Erie Basin
 See Map of Ohio's Principal Streams and Drainage Areas, including a small but important extension of waterway mapping across Ohio's Lake Erie Basin borders into the states of Indiana, Michigan, and Pennsylvania

New York 
 Lake Erie Basin (pp 235-279 of the Comprehensive Wildlife Conservation Strategy for New York)
 Lake Erie/Chautauqua Creek Watershed Waterbody Inventory

Ohio 
 Map of Ohio's Lake Erie watersheds
 Map of Ohio's Principal Streams and Drainage Areas, including a small but important extension of waterway mapping across Ohio's Lake Erie Basin borders into the states of Indiana, Michigan, and Pennsylvania
 Chagrin River Watershed Partners
 Report on Toussaint River and Rusha Creek watersheds includes detailed map on page 4

Pennsylvania 
 Pennsylvania's watersheds
 Interactive map of Pennsylvania's watersheds
 Pennsylvania Lake Erie NEMO Project on land use and water quality
 Pennsylvania Lake Erie Drainage Basin map
 Pennsylvania Lake Erie Basin Subwatersheds map
 See Map of Ohio's Principal Streams and Drainage Areas, including a small but important extension of waterway mapping across Ohio's Lake Erie Basin borders into the states of Indiana, Michigan, and Pennsylvania
 Samuel Bates'  History of Erie County, Pennsylvania, 1884, Chapter IV Streams, Lakes, Bays, Bridges and Culverts
 Mill Creek Flood of August 3, 1915

Ontario 
 Priority Environmental Site Map for Ontario

Watersheds of Canada
Watersheds of the United States
Watersheds of Michigan
Lake Erie